The Hawaii amakihi (Chlorodrepanis virens), also known as the common amakihi, is a species of Hawaiian honeycreeper.

Taxonomy
The Hawaii amakihi was formerly placed in the genus Hemignathus but was assigned to the genus Chlorodrepanis based on the phylogenetic analysis of mitochondrial and nuclear DNA sequences.

There are two recognized subspecies: C. v. wilsoni on Maui, Molokai, and (formerly) Lānai, and C. v. virens on the Big Island of Hawaii.

Description 

Song
The primary song of the Hawaii amakihi is a rapid trill.

Diet
The Hawaii amakihi has a very wide diet, and has been able to find food despite habitat alteration.  It has a tubular tongue, which it uses to drink nectar from flowers such as those of the ōhia lehua (Metrosideros polymorpha), ākala (Rubus hawaiensis), and māmane (Sophora chrysophylla). If necessary, it will suck juice from fruits. The Hawaii amakihi also hunts for spiders and insects among trees and shrubs.

Breeding
Hawaii amakihi are a productive species with a long breeding season, lasting about 9 months. On the Big Island, Maui and Molokaʻi there is variation in when that breeding season starts but it may coincide with flowering of māmane in dry māmane forests.  Hawaii amakihi nest in the canopy of trees. They often are able to have two broods within a breeding season; having two rounds of chicks enables their population to increase more rapidly than slow growing species like the endangered Kiwikiu. Chicks remain in the nest for 15-21 days before they fledge.  Young  Hawaii amakihi become independent from their parents at 2-3 months.

Habitat and Distribution 
It is found on the Big Island, Maui, and Molokai in Hawaii. It formerly occurred on Lānai where it was last seen in 1976. On Maui they have also been successful in forests of introduced pines, cypresses and firs. Of all the forest birds native to Hawaii, the Hawaii amakihi has been affected the least by habitat changes. It is suspected that it is evolving resistance to diseases such as avian malaria. Along with the Apapane, it is one of the two Hawaiian honeycreepers listed by the IUCN as being of least concern.

References

External links

 Images - Monte M. Taylor
 Videos, photos and sounds - Internet Bird Collection

Chlorodrepanis
Biota of Hawaii (island)
Endemic birds of Hawaii
Birds described in 1851
Least concern biota of Oceania
Least concern biota of the United States
Taxonomy articles created by Polbot